The 1991 South American Rugby Championship was the 17th edition of the competition of the leading national Rugby Union teams in South America.

For the first time, the tournament wasn't played in a host country, but in different venues in each countrie participating.

Standings 

{| class="wikitable"
|-
!width=165|Team
!width=40|Played
!width=40|Won
!width=40|Drawn
!width=40|Lost
!width=40|For
!width=40|Against
!width=40|Difference
!width=40|Pts
|- bgcolor=#ccffcc align=center
|align=left| 
|4||4||0||0||194||31||+ 163||8
|- align=center
|align=left| 
|4||3||0||1||109||70||+ 39||6
|- align=center
|align=left| 
|4||2||0||2||72||109||- 37||4
|- align=center
|align=left| 
|4||1||0||3||74||97||- 23||2
|- align=center
|align=left| 
|4||0||0||4||35||177||- 142||0
|}

Results

References

1991
1991 rugby union tournaments for national teams
1991 in Argentine rugby union
rugby union
rugby union
rugby union
rugby union